Elvir Rahimić (born 4 April 1976) is a Bosnian football coach and former professional player who spent the majority of his career playing for Russian Premier League club CSKA Moscow. He is currently a coach for the Bosnia and Herzegovina national team.

Club career
Rahimić started his career with the football club Slaven Živinice in his hometown Živinice. In 1994, he was signed by NK Bosna. In 1997, Rahimić moved to Slovenia for Interblock Ljubljana, then Austrian side SK Vorwärts Steyr before he moved to Russia.

The greatest accomplishment for Rahimić has been winning the 2005 UEFA Cup (by beating Sporting Lisbon 3–1 in the Final at Estádio José Alvalade) and participation in the 2005 UEFA Super Cup.

Rahimić is one of the most decorated Bosnian players, having won 18 trophies with CSKA Moscow during his 12-year spell with the club.

In January 2013 Rahimić passed the category A coaching license exam, and was appointed as a player-coach at CSKA. Rahimić announced he would retire from the game at the end of the 2013–14 season on 13 May 2014.

International career
Rahimić was born in Bosnia and was initially invited to play for Uzbekistan (where it was a common practice to invite Russian-speaking foreigners in 2000-2001). All in all, Rahimić opted for his homeland and made his debut for Bosnia and Herzegovina on 2 June 2007 in a win against Turkey. Including his debut match, he played six in UEFA Euro 2008 qualifying. He also played in 2010 FIFA World Cup qualification where Bosnia reached play-off stage of the competition, as well as UEFA Euro 2012 qualifying.

He has earned a total of 40 caps, scoring no goals. His final international was an August 2013 friendly match against the United States.

Career statistics

Club
Source:

1Includes UEFA Europa League and UEFA Champions League.
2Includes Russian Super Cup, Russian Premier League Cup and UEFA Super Cup.

Honours
Bosna Visoko
Second League of Bosnia and Herzegovina: 1995–96 (North) 

CSKA Moscow 
Russian Premier League: 2003, 2005, 2006, 2012–13, 2013–14
Russian Cup: 2001–02, 2004–05, 2005–06, 2007–08, 2008–09, 2010–11, 2012–13
Russian Super Cup: 2004, 2006, 2007, 2009, 2013
UEFA Cup: 2005

References

External links

1976 births
Living people
People from Živinice
Bosniaks of Bosnia and Herzegovina
Bosnia and Herzegovina people of Uzbekistani descent
Association football midfielders
Bosnia and Herzegovina footballers
Bosnia and Herzegovina international footballers
NK Bosna Visoko players
NK IB 1975 Ljubljana players
SK Vorwärts Steyr players
FC Anzhi Makhachkala players
PFC CSKA Moscow players
UEFA Cup winning players
Premier League of Bosnia and Herzegovina players
Slovenian Second League players
Austrian Football Bundesliga players
Russian First League players
Russian Premier League players
Bosnia and Herzegovina expatriate footballers
Expatriate footballers in Slovenia
Bosnia and Herzegovina expatriate sportspeople in Slovenia
Expatriate footballers in Austria
Bosnia and Herzegovina expatriate sportspeople in Austria
Expatriate footballers in Russia
Bosnia and Herzegovina expatriate sportspeople in Russia